Kalgin Island (Dena'ina: Qelghin) is an island in Cook Inlet of the Gulf of Alaska, southwest of the city of Kenai, Alaska, United States.

References
Kalgin Island: Block 1052, Census Tract 1, Kenai Peninsula Borough, Alaska United States Census Bureau

Islands of Alaska
Islands of Kenai Peninsula Borough, Alaska